893 Leopoldina (prov. designation:  or ) is a large and elongated background asteroid from the outer regions of the asteroid belt. It was discovered by German astronomer Max Wolf at the Heidelberg Observatory on 31 May 1918. It was named for Germany's national academy, the Academy of Sciences Leopoldina in Halle.

Orbit and classification 

Leopoldina is a non-family asteroid of the main belt's background population when applying the hierarchical clustering method to its proper orbital elements. It orbits the Sun in the outer asteroid belt at a distance of 2.6–3.5 AU once every 5 years and 4 months (1,950 days; semi-major axis of 3.05 AU). Its orbit has an eccentricity of 0.15 and an inclination of 17° with respect to the ecliptic. The body's observation arc begins with its official discovery observation at Heidelberg Observatory on 31 May 1918.

Physical characteristics 

In the Tholen classification, Leopoldinas asteroid spectral type is closest to that of an X-type, and somewhat similar to that of a dark F-type asteroid (XF), while in both the Tholen- and SMASS-like taxonomy of the Small Solar System Objects Spectroscopic Survey (S3OS2), it is a common carbonaceous C-type asteroid.

Naming 

This minor planet was named for Germany's national academy, the Academy of Sciences Leopoldina in Halle, Saxony-Anhalt. The  was mentioned in The Names of the Minor Planets by Paul Herget in 1955.

Rotation period 

In April 2008, a rotational lightcurve of Leopoldina was obtained from photometric observations by Brian Warner at the Palmer Divide Observatory  in Colorado. Analysis gave a classically shaped bimodal lightcurve with a well-defined rotation period of  hours and a brightness variation of  magnitude. The result supersedes Warner's previous observation from August 2005, which determined a period of  hours and an amplitude of  magnitude.

Diameter and albedo 

The Collaborative Asteroid Lightcurve Link adopts the results obtained by IRAS, that is, an albedo of 0.0497 and a diameter of 76.14 kilometers based on an absolute magnitude of 9.47.

Three asteroid occultation were obtained on 29 January 1996, 30 August 2010 and 16 May 2015. They gave a best-fit ellipse dimension of 79.0 × 72.0 kilometers, 82.8 × 59.8 kilometers (best), and 75.0 × 75.0 kilometers, respectively. These timed observations are taken when the asteroid passes in front of a distant star.

Notes

References

External links 
 Lightcurve Database Query (LCDB), at www.minorplanet.info
 Dictionary of Minor Planet Names, Google books
 Discovery Circumstances: Numbered Minor Planets (1)-(5000) – Minor Planet Center
 
 

000893
Discoveries by Max Wolf
Named minor planets
000893
19180531